Tom Sweterlitsch (born 1977) is an American author who has published the novels Tomorrow and Tomorrow and The Gone World.

Publications
In Tomorrow and Tomorrow, Sweterlitsch addresses the cultural shift of recent years in a dystopian version of the United States. Facing depression, the main protagonist spends too much time in virtual reality, mourning his pregnant wife, dead in a nuclear terrorist attack that destroyed Pittsburgh. He also looks at problems created by highly personalized advertising.

In The Gone World, the author uses time travel in a new way: people can travel only to the future, creating a temporary possibility that disappears when the traveler comes back. In the novel, the technique is used for solving crimes. Unfortunately, the protagonists discover the end of the world is getting closer and closer to the present as they explore the future.

Inspirations
Sweterlitsch was introduced to fiction while playing tabletop role-playing games, such as Dungeons & Dragons, when he was teenager. He discovered his love for storytelling while remixing a novel from the Dragonlance Saga in sixth grade.

Science fiction creators that have influenced him include the writers J. G. Ballard, Philip K. Dick, Alice Sheldon, and films by Paul Verhoeven. He is also influenced by Edgar Allan Poe and Raymond Chandler, additionally mentioning William Gibson, Jeff VanderMeer, and Stephen King. Outside of science fiction, Sweterlitsch has expressed appreciation for the works of Dante, Emily Dickinson, Fyodor Dostoevsky, and Gustave Flaubert.

More specifically, for Tomorrow and Tomorrow, he was inspired by The Invention of Morel, by Adolfo Bioy Casares and by The City & The City by China Miéville. For The Gone World, he took inspiration from conversations with his late father-in-law, a U.S. Department of Defense physicist with whom he discussed time travel, and his brother-in-law, a real-life NCIS agent whom he once asked how time travel would affect criminal investigations.

Personal life
Sweterlitsch has a master's degree in literary and cultural theory from Carnegie Mellon and worked for twelve years at the Carnegie Library for the Blind and Physically Handicapped.

Born in Iowa, he was raised in Canton, Ohio. He later moved to Pittsburgh, where he lives with his wife and daughter.

Works

Novels
 Tomorrow and Tomorrow (2014)
 The Gone World (2018)

Short stories
 "The Disposable Man" (2012)
 "The Sandbox Singularity" (2018)
 "Neuro-Dancer" (2020)

Movie scripts
 Rakka (2017), with Oats Studios
 Firebase (2017), with Oats Studios
 Zygote (2017), with Oats Studios

References

21st-century American novelists
American science fiction writers
Living people
1977 births
American male novelists
American male short story writers
21st-century American short story writers
21st-century American male writers
Writers from Canton, Ohio
Writers from Pittsburgh
Novelists from North Carolina